In enzymology, a citrullinase is an enzyme that catalyzes the chemical reaction

L-citrulline + H2O  L-ornithine + CO2 + NH3

Thus, the two substrates of this enzyme are L-citrulline and H2O, whereas its 3 products are L-ornithine, CO2, and NH3.

This enzyme belongs to the family of hydrolases, those acting on carbon-nitrogen bonds other than peptide bonds, specifically in linear amides.  The systematic name of this enzyme class is L-citrulline N5-carbamoyldihydrolase. Other names in common use include citrulline ureidase, citrulline hydrolase, and L-citrulline 5-N-carbamoyldihydrolase.

References

 

EC 3.5.1
Enzymes of unknown structure